Tenkeli is an urban-type settlement in the Sakha Republic, Russia. It was created in the 1960s as a mining settlement exploiting lead deposits. In 1973 the village was granted urban locality status. Until 1989 it had a population of about 3 000 inhabitants but in 1995 mining in the area was deemed unprofitable and the settlement was abandoned.

Sources 

Former populated places in the Sakha Republic